The 2007–08 United Counties League season was the 101st in the history of the United Counties League, a football competition in England.

Premier Division

The Premier Division featured 19 clubs which competed in the division last season, along with two new clubs, promoted from Division One:
Kempston Rovers
Sleaford Town

League table

Division One

Division One featured 14 clubs which competed in the division last season, along with two new clubs, relegated from the Premier Division:
Buckingham Town
Ford Sports Daventry, who changed name to Daventry United

Also, Higham Town merged with Rushden Rangers to form new club Rushden & Higham United.

League table

References

External links
 United Counties League

9
United Counties League seasons